Justin Willman Chambers (born July 11, 1970) is an American actor and former model. He is best known for his role as Dr. Alex Karev in the ABC television drama Grey's Anatomy from 2005 to 2020. Born in Ohio, he went to  Southeastern High School, South Charleston, and later studied acting at New York's HB Studio. Chambers began modeling after being approached by a modeling scout in Paris. He went on to represent fashion brands including Calvin Klein, Armani, and Dolce & Gabbana. Chambers began his acting career with a recurring role in the soap opera Another World and made his feature film debut with a supporting role in 1999's comedy drama Liberty Heights. His breakthrough role came in 2005 when he was cast as Dr. Alex Karev in the ABC medical drama series Grey's Anatomy. Chambers gained widespread recognition as the series progressed and the character became one of the most popular from the hit series, earning multiple nominations and the 2017 Best TV Network Drama Actor at the People's Choice Awards as well as nominations for the Screen Actors Guild Award.

Early life, family and education
Chambers was born in Springfield, Ohio, on July 11, 1970 to Pamela Sue (Willman) and John William Eugene Chambers II, who were both deputy sheriffs. Chambers was raised in Springfield.  He aspired to be a dentist. He has a fraternal twin brother, Jason; one older brother, John Jr. (Chip); and two older sisters, Mia and Susan.  The twins were frequently hospitalized as children due to persistent bouts of pneumonia. He and  Jason attended Southeastern High School in South Charleston, Ohio. Justin later moved to New York, where he studied for four years at HB Studio and Ron Stetson Studios.

Career

Chambers was discovered by a modelling scout on the Paris Metro and went on to star in advertising campaigns for Calvin Klein's fragrance range. He worked throughout Europe, Japan, and the United States for Calvin Klein, Armani, and Dolce & Gabbana. After deciding on an acting career, he relocated to New York City in the early 1990s, where he studied at the HB Studio. Studios and Ron Stetson Studios for four years. 

His first major acting role was in the music video "Ants Marching" by Dave Matthews Band in 1995. He went on to land a few television roles, including a contract role as the original Nicholas Hudson in the NBC soap opera Another World, and New York Undercover. In 1998, he was cast as series regular in the short-lived CBS primetime soap opera Four Corners. Chambers has also appeared in several television movies, such as Harvest of Fire, Rose Hill, and Seasons of Love.

Chambers starred in several movies, notably Liberty Heights (1999, as Trey, alongside Adrien Brody), The Wedding Planner (2001, as Massimo, alongside Jennifer Lopez), The Musketeer (2001), Southern Belles (2005), The Zodiac (2005), and the HBO original movie Hysterical Blindness (2002). In 2003, Chambers was cast as one of the leads in the CBS crime drama Cold Case but left after appearing in only three of the show's first four episodes.

In August 2004, Chambers was cast as surgical intern Alex Karev in Shonda Rhimes's medical drama series Grey's Anatomy, opposite Ellen Pompeo, Sandra Oh, Katherine Heigl, and T. R. Knight. In 2006, along with other cast members, he was awarded a Screen Actors Guild Award for Outstanding Performance by an Ensemble in a Drama Series. In 2009, he also guest-starred on the Grey's Anatomy spin-off, Private Practice, for the Grey's Anatomy/Private Practice crossover event. On January 10, 2020, Chambers officially announced his departure from Grey's Anatomy and that his final episode had aired on November 14, 2019, with a farewell episode airing on March 5, 2020.

Personal life

In 1993, he married Keisha Chambers, a former model agency booker. The two met while Chambers was working for ad campaigns for Calvin Klein and Keisha was working at a modeling agency. They have five children: Isabella (b. December 1994), twins Maya and Kaila (b. June 1997), Eva (b. March 1999) and Jackson (b. January 2002). They have adopted two rescue dogs and own a beagle.

Chambers is involved with the nonprofit organization Pentecostal Christian Church mission Dream Center of Los Angeles. In late January 2008, he revealed that he suffered from a sleep disorder and had checked himself into UCLA Medical Center to treat exhaustion after a period of only two hours of sleep each week. Chambers practices hot yoga.

Filmography

Film

Television

Awards and nominations

References

External links

 

1970 births
Living people
Male actors from Ohio
American male film actors
American male television actors
American male voice actors
People from Springfield, Ohio
20th-century American male actors
21st-century American male actors
American twins